Krishna Debnath (born 10 October 1955) is a retired Bangladeshi justice of the Appellate Division, the highest court of Bangladesh. She was the first Hindu women judge in Bangladesh. She is also Bangladesh's first Hindu female judge of the Appellate Division, Supreme Court.

Early life and education 
Debnath was born on 10 October 1955. Her father's name is  Dinesh Chandra Debnath, who was a judge and law professor at Rajshahi University, and mother's name is Benu Debnath. She passed her LLB and LLM from University of Rajshahi. She joined the judiciary on December 7, 1981 as a ‘Munsef’ after completing her law studies from Dhaka University. Later, in 1996, she was promoted to district and sessions judge. She was appointed as an additional judge on April 17, 2010. Two years later, on April 17, 2012, she was appointed as a permanent judge of the High Court Division.

Career 
Debnath was elevated as additional judge of the High Court Division on 18 April 2010 and appointed judge on 15 April 2012. She appointed at Appellate Division, Supreme Court on 9 January 2022. She retires on 1 September, 2022 after completed her 41-year judicial career.

References

External links 
 Judges' List: High Court Division  Name and Short Biography

Living people
1955 births
University of Rajshahi alumni
Bangladeshi Hindus
Bangladeshi women judges
Supreme Court of Bangladesh justices
21st-century Bangladeshi judges